The Ambassador Extraordinary and Plenipotentiary of the Russian Federation to the People's Republic of China (PRC) is the official representative of the President and the Government of the Russian Federation to the President and the Government of China.

The ambassador and his staff work at large in the Embassy of Russia in Beijing. There are consulates general in Shanghai, Guangzhou, Shenyang and Hong Kong. The post of Russian Ambassador to China is currently held by Igor Morgulov, incumbent since 13 September 2022.

History of diplomatic relations

Diplomatic exchanges between Russia and China began in the seventeenth century, with the occasional dispatch of embassies and missions. One of the earliest was that of Fyodor Baykov in the 1650s. Relations were put on a more permanent footing with the opening of the Russian mission in Peking in 1860. Relations were interrupted by the Russian Revolution in 1917, and with the Bolshevik seizure of power, the existing missions in China ceased to be recognised by the Soviets. They nevertheless continued to operate on behalf of Russian émigrés into the 1920s. Diplomatic relations were established between the Soviet Union and the Republic of China, with the visit of representatives from 1921, before being broken off briefly between 1929 and 1932. The mission was raised to the level of an embassy in 1941, and continued after the establishment of the People's Republic of China.  With the dissolution of the Soviet Union in 1991, diplomatic relations have continued between the People's Republic of China and the Russian Federation.

List of representatives (1658 – present)

Representatives of the Tsardom of Russia to China (1658 – 1721)

Representatives of the Russian Empire to China (1721 – 1912)

Representatives of the Russian Empire to the Republic of China (1912 – 1917)

Representatives of the Soviet Union to the Republic of China (1921 – 1949)

Representatives of the Soviet Union to the People's Republic of China (1949 – 1991)

Representatives of the Russian Federation to the People's Republic of China (1991 – present)

References 

 
China
Russia